East Asia is the 20th studio album recorded by Japanese singer-songwriter Miyuki Nakajima, released in October 1992.

The album features "Shallow Sleep (Asai Nemuri)", a hit single released in July 1992. Nakajima wrote the song as a theme for Shin'ai Naru Mono e, a television drama that she made guest appearance as a doctor.  Shin'ai Naru Mono e's themes song peaked at No. 2 on the Japan's Oricon chart in summer of 1992, and thus became her first single.  This song has sold more than a million copies.

Prior to the release of the album Shin'ai Naru Mono e, the songs "Two Boats" and "Haginohara" were already performed on Yakai, which are experimental theaters Nakajima has performed annually since 1989.

"Thread (Ito)" is a love song Nakajima dedicated to Zenji Nakayama, a later leader of Tenrikyo who got married at that time. In 1998, it was featured on the television drama Seija no Koushin and was also released as a double A-Side single with "Another Name for Life".  This song has become well known through a cover version recorded by the Bank Band, a project which Kazutoshi Sakurai and Takeshi Kobayashi launched for a charity. Their interpretation, featuring Sakurai's vocals, was included on their 2004 Soushi Souai album.

In December 1992, East Asia won the 34th Japan Record Awards for 10 Excellent Albums, which is a prize that honors ten exceptional studio albums.

Track listing
All songs written and composed by Miyuki Nakajima, arranged by Ichizo Seo (except "East Asia" co-arranged by David Campbell)
"East Asia" – 6:48
"" – 4:39
"" – 5:21
"" – 6:35
"" – 6:49
"" – 4:49
"" – 4:39
"" – 8:12
"" – 5:07

Personnel
Miyuki Nakajima – lead and backing vocals
Hideo Yamaki – drums
Eiji Shimamura – drums
Jun Aoyama – drums programming
Kenji Takamizu – electric bass
Yasuo Tomikura – electric bass
Chiharu Mikuzuki – electric bass
Tsuyoshi Kon – electric guitar, pedal steel guitar
Takayuki Hijikata – electric guitar
Shigeru Suzuki – electric guitar
Chuei Yoshikawa – acoustic guitar
Elton Nagata – acoustic piano, keyboards
Yasuharu Nakanishi – acoustic piano, keyboards
Nobuo Kurata – acoustic piano, keyboards, synth bass
Nobu Saito – percussion
Toshihiko Furumura – alto sax
Joe's Group – strings
Neko Saito Group – strings
Syd Page Group – strings
Keishi Urata – computer programming
Nobuhiko Nakayama – computer programming
Tatsuhiko Mori – computer programming
Ichizo Seo – computer programming, backing vocals
Yuiko Tsubokura – backing vocals, featuring vocals on "Two Boats"
Kazuyo Sugimoto – backing vocals, featuring vocals on "Two Boats"
Keiko Wada – backing vocals
Yoko Yamauchi – backing vocals
Raven Kane – backing vocals
Julia Waters – backing vocals
Maxine Waters – backing vocals
Akiya – backing vocals

Production
Recording engineer: Tad Goto
Additional engineers: Takanobu Ichikawa, Ray Blair
Assiatant engineers: Yutaka Uematsu, Yoshiyuki Yokoyama, Hajime Nagai, Masataka Itoh, Takamasa Kido, Naomi Matsuo, Nobuhiko Nakayama, Tomotaka Takehara, Masashi Kudo, Shouji Sekine, Kenji Nakamura, Jim Gillens
Mixing engineers: Tad Goto, Joe Chiccarelli
Assistants for the mixing engineer: Tomotaka Takehara, Jamie Seyberth
Music coordinators: Koji Kimura, Fumio Miyata, Tomoko Takaya, Ruriko Duer
Art direction and photographer: Jin Tamura
Cover designer: Hirofumi Arai
Illustrator: Shigeko Kashima
Hair and make-up: Noriko Izumisawa
Artist management: Kouji Suzuki
Assistant: Maki Nishida
Management desk: Atsuko Hayashi
General management: Takahiro Uno
Promoter: Tadayoshi Okamoto, Shoko Aoki. Narihiko Yoshida
Artists and repertoire: Yuzo Watanabe, Koichi Suzuki
Assistant for the record producer: Tsuyoshi Ito
Promoter for the recording artist: Yoshio Kan
Dad: Genichi Kawakami
Mastering at Future Disc Systems in Los Angeles, by Tom Baker

Chart positions

Album

Singles

Awards

Release history

References

Miyuki Nakajima albums
1992 albums
Pony Canyon albums